Penns Manor Area High School is a public high school in Indiana County, Pennsylvania, serving the communities of Clymer and Heilwood, as well as Cherryhill and Pine Townships. The campus is located between the communities at the junction/multiplex of Routes 403, 553, and 580.

School History
Penns Manor Joint School District was formed in 1952 when the Clymer, Pine Township, and Cherryhill school districts came together. The current high school was built in 1960 and the former high schools were then used as elementary schools. When deciding on a name for the school, the suggestions included Pinemer and Penns Manor, among others. Penns Manor was chosen and the new high school was opened in the fall of 1960. A complete, $6.9 Million Dollar renovation was completed in 1994.

Vocational Education
Students in grades 10-12 have the opportunity to attend the Indiana County Technology Center in White Township for part of their school day if they wish to obtain training in a specific area that the ICTC offers.

Athletics

Boys Athletics
 Baseball - Class A
 Basketball - Class AA
 Cross Country - Class A
 Football - Class A
 Track and Field - Class AA

Girls Athletics 
 Basketball - Class AA
 Cross Country - Class A
 Softball - Class A
 Track and Field - Class A
 Volleyball - Class A

See also
 Penns Manor Area School District

References

External links
 Penns Manor Area Hign School

Public high schools in Pennsylvania
Public middle schools in Pennsylvania
Schools in Indiana County, Pennsylvania
Educational institutions established in 1960
1960 establishments in Pennsylvania